Taxali Gate Cemetery (also known as Gora Kabristan at Taxali Gate)  is a Christian cemetery in Lahore, Pakistan.

Location
It is close to the city center of Lahore, near the Badshahi Mosque and opposite from the Taxali Gate and the Lahore Fort. The cemetery dates to the 1800s and is currently in poor condition.

History
During the British India period, soldiers camped in the fort near the cemetery. Currently, there is an acute shortage of burial space in the cemetery.

Notable interments
Many notable graves dating back to the British era, are located here including:
 Alvin Robert Cornelius
 Charles William Forman
 Marcaret J Forman, wife of Charles William Forman
 Sir Henry Adolphus Rattigan
 Walter Allen Robinson
 Dhian Singh
 Mary Caroline
 Meera Elizabeth
 Martha FR Half
 William Montgomery
 Dr Charles
 Sara John H
 Edward Henry John
 Richard Reign
 Sister Mary
 Edward Herbert
 John Edward Hutson
 James Alex
 Earnest Alfred
 James C S Stag

See also
 List of cemeteries in Pakistan
 List of cemeteries in Karachi
 List of cemeteries in Lahore

References

External links
 

Cemeteries in Lahore